John of Kronstadt or John Iliytch Sergieff (post-reform ;  1829 – ) was a Russian Orthodox archpriest and a member of the Most Holy Synod of the Russian Orthodox Church. He was known for his mass confessions, numerous miracles, charitable work, anti-communism, monarchism, chauvinism, and antisemitism.

John is a saint of the Eastern Orthodox Church and is known with the epithet "Righteous".

Early life
He came from a hereditary corporation of village clergymen, and his father was a poor dyachok in the local church. The little that is known about his early life is mainly from late memories. In his autobiography, he claims that his parents gave him to a parish school but that the study was too difficult for him. However, he prayed earnestly and received inspiration. He became the top student in the school and then in the seminary, which enabled him to enter the Theological Academy in Saint Petersburg, the Russian capital. He became the 35th out of 39 students who graduated from the academy in 1855.

"Kronstadt Father" 
From 1855, he worked as a priest in Saint Andrew's Cathedral in Kronstadt, the naval base near St. Petersburg. He married the 26-year-old daughter of the archpriest of the cathedral. Benjamin (Fedchenkov) (1880—1961) writes that after the marriage, he surprisingly refused to have sexual relations with his wife, despite her complaints to the church authorities. Their niece Rufina lived with John and Elizabeth.

The young priest behaved unusually:
He walked along the street and constantly prayed and crossed his arms on his chest.
He tried to serve the liturgy every day.
During the service, he behaved very expressively, deviated from the usual text and turned his back to the altar.
He introduced the practice of frequent Confession and Holy Communion although once or twice a year was then usual.
He allowed the easing from some requirements for the Communicant (in particular, he allowed women during menstruation to communicate, which was usually forbidden).

Not everyone perceived his innovations positively, especially church authorities. His biographer Nadieszda Kizenko notes that some aspects of John's behaviour were reminiscent of the practices of Protestants and others of the Khlysts, sectarians. Nevertheless, his distinctive style attracted attention to the young priest and allowed him to show his charisma.

Gradually, around him formed a circle of persistent admirers, who aspired to confess and to receive communion exclusively from him. Almost all were women. Some of the admirers of John formed a sect of Ioannites. The head of the sect was the spiritual daughter of John, Matryona Ivanovna Kiseleva, who received in the sect the name of Porfiriia or the ″Theotokos″. The Ioannites believed that the world as they knew it was about to end, probably after the revolution, and that they could find salvation only by going to God in the person of Father John. Some taught that John was Prophet Elijah, others Jesus Christ, others God of Sabaoth. The Ioannites spread stories about the "miracles" performed by John, sold the objects related to him and Holy Water, which was sanctified by John himself.

John established a special relief organization. It was called the "House of the Industry" and opened in Kronstadt in 1882. It had its own church, an elementary school for boys and girls, an orphanage, a hospital for anyone who came there, a boarding house, a free public library, shelter for the homeless that accommodated 40,000 people each year, a variety of workshops in which the impoverished could earn some money, a cheap public canteen that served about 800 free dinners on holidays and a hostel for the travelers.

By the early 1890s, John had become well known, and people from all over Russia came to him every day in thousands. He practiced mass confessions during which thousands of people wiped out their sins and went into a frenzy, which was often accompanied by hysterics and tears. Even Tsar Alexander III of Russia in 1894 summoned Father John to Livadia Palace, in the Crimea, as Alexander lay dying of kidney disease. John claimed later that he had raised the dead but failed to heal the Tsar by his prayers.

John came to a wide prominence after the publication of an open letter in the newspaper  Novoe Vremya (literally New Time) in 1883. The publication was also a turning point in the relationship between John and his church authorities. In the open letter, 16 people told about their healing thanks to the prayers of Father John and swore, "Now live according to God's truth and go to Holy Communion as often as possible". Such a publication in a secular newspaper violated the rules under which the religious censor had to preapprove the article, and it was perceived by the church hierarchy as interference into its affairs and a violation of subordination by John. The church did not know what to do with a person who suddenly claimed to be a living wonderworker with healing power (only relics were thought to have that power). The situation was discussed by the highest church organ, the Most Holy Synod, whose hierarchs were in disarray, and especially the metropolitan, Isidore, the direct supervisor of Father John, who was dissatisfied. However, they could do nothing although only after the invitation to the bed of the dying tsar in 1894 that John became immune to its criticism although he did not make any of the expected miracles there.

John was widely venerated as a saint even during his lifetime because of his fame as a powerful prayer, healer, and visionary. The Ioannites sect even stated that John was a god himself, a home for Father, Son, and Holy Spirit at the same time.

In the fall of 1907, John was appointed by Tsar Nicholas II as a member of the Holy Synod, but John did not participate in any meeting of the Holy Synod because of his serious illness.

Support for Russian far right

John at first condemned the participants in the Kishinev pogrom but changed his mind. He apologized to its organisers and accused the Jews themselves of the pogroms. After the Russian Revolution of 1905, he became an ally of Russian far-right radicals, also known as the Black Hundreds, who fought against left-wing activists, liberals and Jews. He was a honorary member of the Union of the Russian People and several other right-wing organizations. He became one of the most celebrated clerics of the Russian Orthodox Church who supported the creator of the Union, Alexander Dubrovin. When Dubrovin invited the hierarchs of Moscow, St. Petersburg and Kiev as well as John to a mass meeting in November 1906, only John attended. Moreover, Metropolitan Anthonii of St. Petersburg sent Dubrovin a sharp rebuke and called his organization terrorist. John publicly consecrated the banners of the Union, thus inspiring its leaders.

John was the only priest of St. Andrew's Cathedral to flee from Kronstadt during the uprising in 1905. The rest of the priests of St. Andrew's Cathedral held a procession to the rebels and urged them to stop the uprising. The press accused John of cowardice after that act, and journals published caricatures of him.

Nikolai Leskov and Maxim Gorky were very critical of John. Gorky called him an "actor of the Imperial Churches". Leskov ridiculed John in his work Polunochniki ("Night Owls") and in a variety of letters. John was also known for his fierce attacks on Leo Tolstoy, whom he considered the devil. John wrote to Tolstoy, "You ought to have stone hung around your neck and be lowered with it into the depths of the sea". In 1902, a collection of such diatribes was published, and Tolstoy did not pay attention to them.

His support of far-right movements and such aggressive attacks on Tolstoy led to the fact that the attitude of the "progressives" in society towards John became negative, and his figure became the personification of "Reactionary" forces.

Death, canonization, and legacy

The coffin with the body was transported through St. Petersburg with pompous ceremonies and buried in the Ioannovsky Convent. According to his last will, the convent also got all of his things, which brought great benefits to it and aroused suspicions of forgery.

In 1909, Tsar Nicholas II wrote an order to establish the commemoration of St. John in the Church. Subsequently, the Holy Synod issued an edict to commemorate him annually on the day of his death.

His grave became a place of pilgrimage. After the October Revolution, the Soviet authorities decided to eliminate it. In 1923 to 1926, when the Ioannovsky Convent began to be closed, the option of reburial in one of the cemeteries was discussed, but the idea met resistance from Soviet authorities, who feared that the new grave would become another place of veneration. Also discussed the option of bricking up the crypt and later burying the remains more deeply, along with concreting the floor of the crypt. It is known that the crypt was indeed bricked up, but there is no information on reburial. The book of the Soviet historian of religion Nikolai Yudin claimed that a coffin with the bones of John was taken far out of city and burned. After 1990, the Church-necropolis of John was consecrated in the crypt of the Cathedral of the Twelve Apostles of the Ioannovsky Convent; inside the Church necropolis, where the coffin of John used to be, a new empty coffin on the floor (sarcophagus) was built. The official website of the John Convent claims that the relics continue to be in the crypt, but there have been no excavations that could prove it. The Orthodox Encyclopedia:' states that the tombstone (sarcophagus) is located above John's relics.

In 1964, he was canonized by the Russian Orthodox Church Outside Russia (ROCOR). It was the first such canonization independent from Moscow Patriarchate. St. John Maximovitch of San Francisco played an active role in preparing his canonization. A well-known conservative ideologist of the ROCOR, Archimandrite Constantine (Zaitsev) believed that the most powerful heavenly patrons of Russia were John and Nicholas II with his family.

In 1990, after the beginning of perestroika and the liberalization of church life in the Soviet Union, John was canonized by the Moscow Patriarchate. Also, after 1990, the rehabilitation of the sectarian Ioannites started, and even the Ioannite leaders who had been condemned by the Synod were incorporated into the mainstream Orthodoxy in Russia.

From 1990 to 2016, more than 60 new churches or altars in Russia alone were dedicated to him. his flat in Kronstadt was partly restored and officially registered as a memorial museum. His biography was published in the most respected Russian series of biographical books,  Lives of Remarkable People. The John Apartment Museum is located in Kronstadt, at 21 Posadskaya Street. Monuments to John have been placed in Kronstadt, Irkutsk and Moscow.

Ioannovsky Convent, the second-largest monastic community in Saint Petersburg, is closely connected with his name. It was established by John, and during his life, he spiritually nourished the convent.

In 2014, Vitaly Milonov proposed to establish 14 June as a memorial day for John in Saint Petersburg. But the Federation of Jewish Communities of the CIS was absolutely opposed and made an official statement: "John of Kronstadt was a member of the odious Black-Hundred organization Union of the Russian People, known for its terrible anti-Semitism and moral support for Jewish pogroms in pre-revolutionary Russia"Putin ally accused of pushing Jews-killed-Jesus trope, Jewish Telegraphic Agency, April 2, 2014.

Iconography and commemoration
Icons of John most commonly portray him holding a Communion chalice because he reawakened the Russian Orthodox Church to the apostolic tradition of receiving Holy Communion every Divine Liturgy.

His life and work are commemorated on the feast days of 20 December Old Style (2 January New Style)December 20/January 2 . Orthodox Calendar (PRAVOSLAVIE.RU). and October 19 Old Style (1 November New Style).

 Works in translation 
 Predigt am Tage der Einführung der Allgepriesenen Jungfrau Maria in den Tempel translated by Karl Christian Felmy (in German)
 Predigt über die Kommunion der heiligen Geheimnisse translated by Karl Christian Felmy (in German)
 Mein Leben in Christo. Aus dem Tagebuch, Übers. v. S. H. Kurio, München 2008, .
 Blessed Father John of Kronstadt on Prayer (1966 Jordanville)
 Counsels on the Christian Priesthood, tr. W. J. Grisbrooke (1994 Crestwood)
 Spiritual Counsels of Father John of Kronstadt, tr. E. E. Goulaev (1967 London)
 My Life In Christ Or Moments of Spiritual Serenity ... Extracts From The Diary Of ... John Ilyich Sergieff ... Cronstadt ... Translated ... By E. E. Goulaeff (1897) 
 My Life in Christ at archive.org
 Sorrow and Joy: A Homily on the Day of the Nativity of the Most Holy Mother of God at pravoslavie.ru

Notes

References

 Further reading 
 Алабовский М., священник. Великий пастырь русского народа. (Блаженной памяти о. Иоанна Кронштадтского). Киев, 1909;
 Свящ. А. Семенов-Тян-Шанский. Отец Иоанн Кронштадтский. — Изд-во им. Чехова, Нью-Йорк, 1955.
 Игумения Таисия. Записки. Беседы с отцом Иоанном Кронштадтским. СПб, 2002.
 Митрополит Вениамин (Федченков). Святой праведный Иоанн Кронштадтский. СПб, 2005.
 Санакина Т. А., сост. (ГААО), «Из родословной семьи Сергиевых: Иоанн Ильич Сергиев (Кронштадтский) и его семья», Наш храм, 2002, № 2, 2-3.
 В.В. Антонов, А.В. Кобак. Святыни Санкт-Петербурга. Историко-церковная энциклопедия в трех томах. СПб.: Издательство Чернышева, Т.1, 1994. - 288 с., Т.2, 1996. - 328 с., Т.3, 1996. - 392 с., ил.
 Walter Laqueur: Der Schoß ist fruchtbar noch. Der militante Nationalismus der russischen Rechten; München 1995; S. 76–83.
 Alla Selawry: Johannes von Kronstadt: Starez Rußlands; Dornach: Pforte, 1989; 
 Karl Christian Felmy: Predigt im orthodoxen Russland. Untersuchungen zu Inhalt und Eigenart der russischen Predigt in der 2. Hälfte des 19. Jahrhunderts, Göttingen 1972, Vandenhoeck und Ruprecht, 
 Aksenov, R., „Pasi ovzy Moja“. Utschenie o pastyrstwe swjatogo Ioanna Kronschtadtskogo, W pomoschtsch pastyrju, Klin 2002.
 Akwilonow, E. P., Mysli o. Ioanna Kronschtadtskago o wospitatelnom snatschenii slowa Boschija, St. Petersburg 1909.
 Bishop Alexander (Mileant). Saint John of Kronstadt
 Большаков Н. И. Источник живой воды. — СПб., 1910.
 Duchonina, E. W., Is moich wospominanij ob o. Ioanne Kronschtadtskom, St. Petersburg 1907.
 Felmy, K. C., La teologia eucaristica di Ioann di Kronstadt, trans. by E. Cosentino, in: La Grande Vigilia, ed. A. Mainardi, Spiritualità orientale, Bose 1998, 225-242.
 Ioann (Samojlow), Pastyr – sowerschitel Bogosluschenija. Po sotschinenijam swjatogo prawednogo Ioanna Kronschtadtskogo, Sergiew Posad 2007, .

 Knechten, H. M., Licht in der Finsternis – Johannes von Kronstadt, Studien zur russischen Spiritualität VII, Kamen 2010, .
 Konstantin (Sajzew), Duchownyj oblik protoiereja o. Ioanna Kronschtadtskago, Jordanville 1952.
 Michail (Semenow), Otez Ioann Kronschtadtski. (Polnaja biografija s illjustrazijami), St. Petersburg 1903.
 Ornatski, I. N., Schitie i trudy prisnopamjatnogo protoiereja prawednika o. Ioanna Kronschtadtskogo, Moskau 1916.
 Parfeni (Kotow), Spasenie w Zerkwi. Po tworenijam swjatogo prawednogo Ioanna Kronschtadtskogo, Moskau 2004, .
 Romuschin, W., Swjatoj Ioann Kronschtadtski w Krymu, Simferopol 2005, .
 Schenskaja Surskaja obitel, O. Ioann Kronschtadtski. (Polnaja biografija s illjustrazijami), Archangelsk 2004, .
 Smirnowa, E. S., ed., Kronschtadtski pastyr, Zerkowno-istoritscheski almanach, Bd. 1, Moskau 2002, .
 Sokolowa, T. A., ed., Swjatoj prawednyj Ioann Kronschtadtski. 1829-1908. Sbornik, Rossijskie sudby 11, Moskau 1998.
 К характеристике о. Иоанна Сергиева (Кронштадского). // Старообрядец : журнал. — 1906. — № 2. — С. 217—221.
 Strischew, A. N., ed., Swjatoj prawednyj Ioann Kronschtadtski w wospominanijach samowidzew, Moskau 1997.
 Surski, I. K., Otez Ioann Kronschtadtski, Moskau 2008, .
 Tereschtschenko, T. N., Simfonija po tworenijam swjatogo prawednogo Ioanna Kronschtadtskogo, Moskau 2007, .
 Weniamin (Fedtschenkow), Otez Ioann Kronschtadtski, St. Petersburg 32005, .
 Werchowzewa, W. T., Wospominanija ob otze Ioanne Kronschtadtskom jego duchownoj dotscheri, Sergiew Posad 1916.
 Whyte, A. D., Father John of the Greek Church''. An Appreciation, with some characteristic passages of his mystical and spiritual autobiography ("My Life in Christ"), Edinburgh, London u. New York 1898.
 Зимина Н. П. Православная Энциклопедия/ Т. 25, С. 127-139/ Иоанниты

External links

 Saint John of Kronstadt, orthodoxwiki.org
 Biography of St John of Kronstadt, CCEL
 Pyhä Johannes Kronstadtilainen 
 
 Surskiy I.K. Holy father Ioann of Kronstadt 
 Biography at www.ortho-rus.ru 
 
 
 

1829 births
1909 deaths
People from Pinezhsky District
People from Pinezhsky Uyezd
Russian Eastern Orthodox priests
19th-century Eastern Orthodox priests
19th-century Christian mystics
20th-century Eastern Orthodox priests
20th-century Christian mystics
20th-century Christian saints
Russian monarchists
Russian anti-communists
Eastern Orthodox mystics
Clairvoyants
Members of the Union of the Russian People
Russian saints of the Eastern Orthodox Church
Miracle workers